Lawrence J. Whalley MB, BS, MD, DPM, FRCP(E), FRC Psych was formerly the Crombie Ross Professor of Mental Health in the University of Aberdeen, Scotland, UK from 1992 to 2008. He is professor emeritus at the University of Aberdeen and from 2010 part-time professor of research at the University of the Highlands and Islands.

Whalley is best known for follow-up studies of 757 Aberdeen City and Shire residents who took part at age 11 years in the Scottish Mental Surveys of 1932 and 1947. He has authored or co-authored more than 300 scientific publications (Google H-index = 67 in 2019), seven books and has contributed to many TV and radio programs mostly about the dementias of old age. Notably, he co-authored "A lifetime of Intelligence" with Deary & Starr (published by the American Psychological Association in 2009) and "Dementia" with John Breitner (Montreal) in 2002 and 2010. He was among the most highly cited academic staff members at the University of Aberdeen.

Whalley's popular science account of "The Ageing Brain" (Phoenix Press, 2004, published in the USA and translated into Spanish, Italian and Japanese)  describes some of his research findings on brain structural and functional magnetic resonance imaging, nutrition, genetics and physical health and how these explain differences in individual rates of aging of some mental abilities while others are relatively preserved. His work "Understanding brain aging and dementia: a life course approach" was published in 2015 by Columbia University Press . He is currently Crombie Ross Professor emeritus at the University of Aberdeen (2008-2022)and research professor at the University of the Highlands & Islands (2010-2020). He has lectured widely in UK, USA, South Africa, Canada, and Australia mostly about dementia and severe forms of mental illness. He was a member of the senior clinical scientific staff at the MRC Brain Metabolism Unit, Edinburgh University(1978-1986), senior lecturer in psychiatry (Edinburgh University, 1986-1991) and honorary consultant psychiatrist Lothian Health Board (1978-1991). With George Fink in Edinburgh University Whalley investigated the role of oxytocin in severe mental illness and the benefits of ECT. He detected abnormalities of oxytocinergic function in schizoaffective mania, post-partum psychosis and how ECT modified oxytocin release.

Whalley was born on 12 March 1946. He went to school at St Joseph's College, Blackpool (now St Mary's Catholic Academy), 1954–64, graduated in Medicine from the University of Newcastle upon Tyne in 1969.  Whalley trained in neuroendocrinology, geriatrics, neurology, and psychiatry in Oxford and then in Edinburgh where he studied epidemiology, psychometrics, and psychoneuroendocrinology before beginning cytogenetic-environment studies in early-onset Alzheimer’s Disease (EOAD).   In the University of Edinburgh with MRC support, he studied the epidemiology of EOAD in Scotland (1974–1988), found non-random urban "clusters" of EOAD and identified childhood environmental factors which increased risk and reduced survival after dementia onset.   Using kinship analysis he showed ancestral genes could only partly explain some "clusters" and these genes were of small effect at a population level.

Together with Ian Deary and John Starr, he began prospective studies of cognitive decline and vascular risk factors in 1300 healthy old people in Edinburgh (the Healthy Old People in Edinburgh HOPE studies).   In 1997, with the assistance of the Scottish Council for Research in Education, he was granted access to a unique national archive of childhood IQ data (N~160,000) that could be used to estimate lifelong cognitive variation. No other country has ever IQ tested a total population sample in this way. In 1998, he devised a strategy to recruit 285 Aberdeen survivors all born in 1921 of the Scottish Mental Survey of 1932 (subjects by then aged 77) and next, from 1999, he recruited 506 survivors all born in 1936 from a second 1947 Survey (subjects by then aged 63–64 years). These groundbreaking studies were capitalized upon by Ian Deary in Edinburgh who followed up with much more intensive subsequent studies that formed "The Disconnected Mind Project" of adults by then aged 69 years and also born in 1936. Deary consolidated this research program into the internationally renowned Edinburgh University Centre for Cognitive Ageing and Cognitive Epidemiology.

With the support from a Wellcome Professorial Senior Fellowship (2001–2006), Whalley extended his Aberdeen database and followed up these cohorts biennially over 5 years. He showed that dementia incidence is greater in those of lower childhood IQ, that lifetime variation in cognitive performance is linked to specific genetic factors, smoking, nutritional factors, childhood intelligence, and education.

His research colleagues led by Dr. Roger Staff developed advanced statistical models of longitudinal changes in cognitive performance in Whalley's cohorts that include findings from longitudinal brain MRI studies and measures of information processing efficiency. With Deary and Starr, parallel follow-up studies were begun at Edinburgh University.

He took early retirement from the University of Aberdeen in 2008 to focus exclusively on his research and after spending a period in the University of Southern California (curtailed by illness) he returned to Edinburgh, where he has remained. In 2010 he was appointed until 2020 to the part-time staff of the University of the Highlands and Islands with the remit to develop a community-based dementia research program relevant to a rural community.

Books
 Whalley, LJ Understanding Brain Aging and Dementia: A Life Course Approach. pub Columbia University Press (4 Aug. 2015). 
 Deary IJ, Whalley LJ & Starr JM. A Lifetime of Intelligence: Follow-up Studies of the Scottish Mental Surveys of 1932 and 1947. pub American Psychological Association; 1 edition (15 Feb. 2009). .
 Whalley LJ & Breitner JS. Fast Facts: Dementia. pub Health Press Limited; First edition (1 Nov. 2002). 
 Whalley LJ The Ageing Brain (maps of the mind). pub Phoenix; New edition (5 Dec. 2002). .
 Whalley LJ & Breitner JS. Fast Facts: Dementia. pub Health Press Limited; First edition (1 Nov. 2002). ;
 Whalley LJ: The Aging Brain. pub Columbia University Press (30 April 2003); .
 Whalley LJ: Cuando el Cerebro envejece (Spanish). pub Ediciones Entretres (Jan. 2007).  .
 Whalley LJ. Cervelli che non invecchiano. Conoscere e contrastare l'invecchiamento cerebrale. (Italian) pub Giunti Editore (April 2012)’ (Italian). .
 Starr JM & Whalley LJ. ACE Inhibitors: Central Actions. Lippincott Williams & Wilkins (1 Dec. 1993) 
 Fink G & Whalley LJ. Neuropeptides: Basic and Clinical Aspects. Churchill Livingstone (1 Jun. 1982)  
 Glen AIM & Whalley LJ. Alzheimer's Disease: Early Recognition of Potentially Reversible Deficits. Churchill Livingstone (17 Dec. 1979).  .

References
https://web.archive.org/web/20070503180404/http://www.abdn.ac.uk/alzheimers/biographies/whalley.shtml

Living people
British psychiatrists
Year of birth missing (living people)
Fellows of the Royal College of Psychiatrists
Alumni of the University of Edinburgh
Fellows of the Royal College of Physicians of Edinburgh
Academics of the University of Aberdeen
People associated with The Institute for Cultural Research